The first season of The Promised Neverland anime television series is animated by CloverWorks and directed by Mamoru Kanbe, with Toshiya Ono handling series composition, Kazuaki Shimada handling character designs, and Takahiro Obata composing the series' music. It adapted the "Introduction" (chapters 1–9) and "Jailbreak" (chapters 10–37) story arcs from the original manga series of the same name written by Kaiu Shirai and illustrated by Posuka Demizu. The series was announced in the 26th issue of Weekly Shōnen Jump on May 28, 2018, and aired from January 11 to March 29, 2019, on Fuji TV's late-night Noitamina anime programming block. 

UVERworld performs the series' opening theme song "Touch Off," while Cö shu Nie performs the series' ending theme songs "Zettai Zetsumei" and "Lamp".


Episode list

International broadcast
The series is available with multilingual subtitles on iQIYI in South East Asia.

Notes

References

External links

  
 
 
 

The Promised Neverland episode lists
2019 Japanese television seasons